El Che may refer to:

 Che Guevara (1928-1967), an Argentine Marxist revolutionary
 Cheteshwar Pujara (1988-), an Indian Test Cricket Batsman
 El Che (album), a 2010 album by Rhymefest